The 2014 Conference League South season saw two teams leave, St Albans Centurions dropped down to the South Premier while Northampton Demons returned to the Midlands Rugby League Premier Division. Replacing them were Oxford Cavaliers who moved up from the West of England Rugby League and Merthyr based Valley Cougars who rose from the South Wales Conference. The season ran from April to September.
The teams would play each other three times during the regular season with the top four then contesting the play-offs

Clubs

League table

Play-offs

Grand final
Venue - Litchfield RU

Results

Player statistics

Top Try Scorer

Top Goal Kicker

Top Point Scorer

Sources
 statistics

External links
 Conference League South website

Rugby Football League